Pseudotetracha marginicollis is a species of tiger beetle in the subfamily Cicindelinae that was described by Sloane in 1906, and is endemic to Australia.

References

Beetles described in 1906
Endemic fauna of Australia
Beetles of Australia